Evacuees may refer to:

 People who have undergone evacuation
 The Evacuees, a 1975 BBC Play for Today by Jack Rosenthal